

Events

Pre-1600
 328 – Athanasius is elected Patriarch of Alexandria.
1009 – Lombard Revolt: Lombard forces led by Melus revolt in Bari against the Byzantine Catepanate of Italy.
1386 – England and Portugal formally ratify their alliance with the signing of the Treaty of Windsor, making it the oldest diplomatic alliance in the world which is still in force.
1450 – 'Abd al-Latif (Timurid monarch) is assassinated.
1540 – Hernando de Alarcón sets sail on an expedition to the Gulf of California.

1601–1900
1662 – The figure who later became Mr. Punch makes his first recorded appearance in England.
1671 – Thomas Blood, disguised as a clergyman, attempts to steal England's Crown Jewels from the Tower of London.
1726 – Five men arrested during a raid on Mother Clap's molly house in London are executed at Tyburn.
1864 – Second Schleswig War: The Danish navy defeats the Austrian and Prussian fleets in the Battle of Heligoland.
1865 – American Civil War: Nathan Bedford Forrest surrenders his forces at Gainesville, Alabama.
  1865   – American Civil War: President Andrew Johnson issues a proclamation ending belligerent rights of the rebels and enjoining foreign nations to intern or expel Confederate ships.
1873 – Der Krach: The Vienna stock exchange crash heralds the Long Depression.
1877 – Mihail Kogălniceanu reads, in the Chamber of Deputies, the Declaration of Independence of Romania. The date will become recognised as the Independence Day of Romania.

1901–present
1901 – Australia opens its first national parliament in Melbourne.
1915 – World War I: Second Battle of Artois between German and French forces.
1918 – World War I: Germany repels Britain's second attempt to blockade the port of Ostend, Belgium.
1920 – Polish–Soviet War: The Polish army under General Edward Rydz-Śmigły celebrates its capture of Kiev with a victory parade on Khreshchatyk.
1926 – Admiral Richard E. Byrd and Floyd Bennett claim to have flown over the North Pole (later discovery of Byrd's diary appears to cast some doubt on the claim.)
1927 – The Old Parliament House, Canberra, Australia, officially opens.
1936 – Italy formally annexes Ethiopia after taking the capital Addis Ababa on May 5.
1941 – World War II: The German submarine U-110 is captured by the Royal Navy. On board is the latest Enigma machine which Allied cryptographers later use to break coded German messages.
1942 – The Holocaust in Ukraine: The SS executes 588 Jewish residents of the Podolian town of Zinkiv (Khmelnytska oblast. The Zoludek Ghetto (in Belarus) is destroyed and all its inhabitants executed or deported.
1946 – King Victor Emmanuel III of Italy abdicates and is succeeded by Umberto II.
1948 – Czechoslovakia's Ninth-of-May Constitution comes into effect.
1950 – Robert Schuman presents the "Schuman Declaration", considered by some to be the beginning of the creation of what is now the European Union.
1955 – Cold War: West Germany joins NATO.
1960 – The Food and Drug Administration announces it will approve birth control as an additional indication for Searle's Enovid, making Enovid the world's first approved oral contraceptive pill.
1969 – Carlos Lamarca leads the first urban guerrilla action against the military dictatorship of Brazil in São Paulo, by robbing two banks.
1974 – Watergate scandal: The  United States House Committee on the Judiciary opens formal and public impeachment hearings against President Richard Nixon.
1979 – Iranian Jewish businessman Habib Elghanian is executed by firing squad in Tehran, prompting the mass exodus of the once 100,000-strong Jewish community of Iran.
1980 – In Florida, United States, Liberian freighter  collides with the Sunshine Skyway Bridge over Tampa Bay, making a 1,400-ft. section of the southbound span collapse. Thirty-five people in six cars and a Greyhound bus fall 150 ft. into the water and die.
  1980   – In Norco, California, United States, five masked gunmen hold up a Security Pacific bank, leading to a violent shoot-out and one of the largest pursuits in California history. Two of the gunmen and one police officer are killed and thirty-three police and civilian vehicles are destroyed in the chase.
1987 – LOT Flight 5055 Tadeusz Kościuszko crashes after takeoff in Warsaw, Poland, killing all 183 people on board.
1988 – New Parliament House, Canberra officially opens.
1992 – Armenian forces capture Shusha, marking a major turning point in the First Nagorno-Karabakh War.
1992 – Westray Mine disaster kills 26 workers in Nova Scotia, Canada.
2001 – In Ghana, 129 football fans die in what became known as the Accra Sports Stadium disaster. The deaths are caused by a stampede (caused by the firing of tear gas by police personnel at the stadium) that followed a controversial decision by the referee.
2002 – The 38-day stand-off in the Church of the Nativity in Bethlehem comes to an end when the Palestinians inside agree to have 13 suspected terrorists among them deported to several different countries.
2018 – The historic defeat for Barisan Nasional, the governing coalition of Malaysia since the country's independence in 1957 in 2018 Malaysian general election.
2020 – The COVID-19 recession causes the U.S. unemployment rate to hit 14.9 percent, its worst rate since the Great Depression.
2022 – Russo-Ukrainian War: United States President Joe Biden signs the 2022 Lend-Lease Act into law, a rebooted World War II-era policy expediting American equipment to Ukraine and other Eastern European countries.

Births

Pre-1600
1147 – Minamoto no Yoritomo, Japanese shōgun (d. 1199)
1151 – al-Adid, last Fatimid caliph (d. 1171)
1540 – Maharana Pratap, Indian ruler (d. 1597)
1555 – Jerónima de la Asunción, Spanish Catholic nun and founder of the first monastery in Manila (d. 1630)
1594 – Louis Henry, Prince of Nassau-Dillenburg, military leader in the Thirty Years' War (d. 1662)

1601–1900
1617 – Frederick, Landgrave of Hesse-Eschwege (d. 1655)
1740 – Giovanni Paisiello, Italian composer and educator (probable; d. 1816)
1746 – Gaspard Monge, French mathematician and engineer (d. 1818)
1763 – János Batsányi, Hungarian-Austrian poet and author (d. 1845)
1800 – John Brown, American activist (d. 1859)
1801 – Peter Hesketh-Fleetwood, English politician, founded the town of Fleetwood (d. 1866)
1814 – John Brougham, Irish-American actor and playwright (d. 1880)
1823 – Frederick Weld, English-New Zealand politician, 6th Prime Minister of New Zealand (d. 1891)
1824 – Jacob ben Moses Bachrach, Polish apologist and author (d. 1896)
1825 – James Collinson, Victorian painter (d. 1881) 
1836 – Ferdinand Monoyer, French ophthalmologist, invented the Monoyer chart (d. 1912)
1837 – Adam Opel, German engineer, founded the Opel Company (d. 1895)
1845 – Gustaf de Laval, Swedish engineer and businessman (d. 1913)
1850 – Edward Weston, English-American chemist (d. 1936)
1855 – Julius Röntgen, German-Dutch composer (d. 1932)
1860 – J. M. Barrie, Scottish novelist and playwright (d. 1937)
1866 – Gopal Krishna Gokhale, Indian economist and politician (d. 1915)
1870 – Harry Vardon, British golfer (d. 1937)
1873 – Anton Cermak, Czech-American captain and politician, 44th Mayor of Chicago (d. 1933)
1874 – Howard Carter, English archaeologist and historian (d. 1939)
1882 – George Barker, American painter (d. 1965)
  1882   – Henry J. Kaiser, American shipbuilder and businessman, founded Kaiser Shipyards (d. 1967)
1883 – José Ortega y Gasset, Spanish philosopher, author, and critic (d. 1955)
1884 – Valdemar Psilander, Danish actor (d. 1917)
1885 – Gianni Vella, Maltese artist (d. 1977)
1888 – Francesco Baracca, Italian fighter pilot (d. 1918)
  1888   – Rolf de Maré, Swedish art collector (d. 1964)
1892 – Zita of Bourbon-Parma, last Empress of the Austro-Hungarian Empire (d. 1989)
1893 – William Moulton Marston, American psychologist and author (d. 1947)
1894 – Benjamin Graham, British-American economist, professor, and investor (d. 1976)
1895 – Richard Barthelmess, American actor (d. 1963)
  1895   – Lucian Blaga, Romanian poet, playwright, and philosopher (d. 1961)
  1895   – Frank Foss, American pole vaulter (d. 1989)
1896 – Richard Day, Canadian-American art director and set decorator (d. 1972)
1900 – Maria Malicka, Polish stage and film actress (d. 1992)

1901–present
1904 – Conrad Bernier, Canadian-American organist, composer, and educator (d. 1988)
1905 – Lilí Álvarez, Spanish tennis player, author, and feminist (d. 1998)
1906 – Eleanor Estes, American librarian, author, and illustrator (d. 1988)
1907 – Jackie Grant, Trinidadian cricketer (d. 1978)
  1907   – Kathryn Kuhlman, American evangelist and author (d. 1976)
  1907   – Baldur von Schirach, German politician (d. 1974)
1909 – Don Messer, Canadian violinist (d. 1973)
  1909   – Gordon Bunshaft, American architect, designed the Solow Building (d. 1990)
1911 – Harry Simeone, American music arranger, conductor, and composer (d. 2005)
1912 – Pedro Armendáriz, Mexican-American actor (d. 1963)
  1912   – Per Imerslund, Norwegian-German soldier and author (d. 1943)
  1912   – Géza Ottlik, Hungarian mathematician and theorist (d. 1990)
1914 – Patricia Swift Blalock, American librarian (d.2011)
  1914   – Denham Fouts, American prostitute (d. 1948)
  1914   – Thanat Khoman, Thai politician and diplomat (d. 2016)
  1914   – Carlo Maria Giulini, Italian conductor and director (d. 2005)
  1914   – Hank Snow, American country music singer-songwriter and guitarist (d. 1999)
1916 – William Pène du Bois, American author and illustrator (d. 1993)
1917 – Fay Kanin, American screenwriter and producer (d. 2013)
1918 – Moisis Michail Bourlas, Greek soldier and educator (d. 2011)
  1918   – Orville Freeman, American soldier and politician, 16th United States Secretary of Agriculture (d. 2003)
  1918   – Mike Wallace, American journalist, media personality and one-time game show host (d. 2012)
1919 – Clifford Chadderton, Canadian soldier and journalist (d. 2013)
1920 – William Tenn, English-American author and academic (d. 2010)
  1920   – Richard Adams, English novelist (d. 2016)
1921 – Daniel Berrigan, American priest, poet, and activist (d. 2016)
  1921   – Sophie Scholl, German activist (d. 1943)
  1921   – Mona Van Duyn, American poet and academic (d. 2004)
1923 – Johnny Grant, American radio host and producer (d. 2008)
1924 – Bulat Okudzhava, Russian singer, poet, and author (d. 1997)
1926 – John Middleton Murry, Jr., English soldier, pilot, and author (d. 2002)
1927 – Manfred Eigen, German chemist and academic, Nobel Prize laureate (d. 2019)
1928 – Ralph Goings, American painter (d. 2016)
  1928   – Pancho Gonzales, American tennis player (d. 1995)
  1928   – Barbara Ann Scott, Canadian figure skater (d. 2012)
1930 – Joan Sims, English actress (d. 2001)
  1930   – Kalifa Tillisi, Libyan historian and linguist (d. 2010)
1931 – Vance D. Brand, American pilot, engineer, and astronaut
1932 – Conrad Hunte, Barbadian cricketer (d. 1999)
  1932   – Geraldine McEwan, English actress (d. 2015)
1934 – Alan Bennett, English screenwriter, playwright, and novelist
1935 – Nokie Edwards, American guitarist (d. 2018)
  1935   – Roger Hargreaves, English author and illustrator (d. 1988)
1936 – Terry Downes, British boxer and former world middle-weight champion (d. 2017)
  1936   – Albert Finney, English actor (d. 2019)
  1936   – Glenda Jackson, English actress and politician 
1937 – Sonny Curtis, American singer-songwriter and guitarist
  1937   – Rafael Moneo, Spanish architect, designed the Cathedral of Our Lady of the Angels and Valladolid Science Museum
  1937   – Dave Prater, American singer (d. 1988)
1938 – Charles Simić, Serbian-American poet and editor (d. 2023)
1939 – Ralph Boston, American long jumper
  1939   – Ion Țiriac, Romanian tennis player and manager
  1939   – Ken Warby, Australian motorboat racer
  1939   – Giorgio Zancanaro, Italian baritone
  1939   – John Ogbu, Nigerian-American anthropologist and professor (d. 2003)
1940 – James L. Brooks, American director, producer, and screenwriter
1941 – Dorothy Hyman, English sprinter
  1941   – Danny Rapp, American musician (d. 1983)
1942 – John Ashcroft, American lawyer and politician, 79th United States Attorney General
  1942   – Tommy Roe, American singer-songwriter and guitarist
1943 – Vince Cable, English economist and politician, former Secretary of State for Business, Innovation and Skills
  1943   – Anders Isaksson, Swedish historian and journalist (d. 2009)
  1943   – Colin Pillinger, English astronomer, chemist, and academic (d. 2014)
1944 – Richie Furay, American singer-songwriter and guitarist 
1945 – Gamal El-Ghitani, Egyptian journalist and author (d. 2015)
  1945   – Jupp Heynckes, German footballer and manager
  1945   – Steve Katz, American guitarist, songwriter, and producer 
1946 – Candice Bergen, American actress and producer
  1946   – Ayşe Nur Zarakolu, Turkish author and activist (d. 2002)
1947 – Yukiya Amano, Japanese diplomat (d. 2019)
1948 – Hans Georg Bock, German mathematician, computer scientist, and academic
  1948   – John Mahaffey, American golfer
  1948   – Steven W. Mosher, American social scientist and author
  1948   – Calvin Murphy, American basketball player and radio host
1949 – Billy Joel, American singer-songwriter and pianist 
  1949   – Richard S. Williamson, American lawyer and diplomat, 17th Assistant Secretary of State for International Organization Affairs (d. 2013)
1951 – Alley Mills, American actress
1951 – Joy Harjo, American poet, musician, playwright and author, 23rd United States Poet Laureate
1953 – Bruno Brokken, Belgian high jumper
1955 – Meles Zenawi, Prime Minister of Ethiopia (d. 2012) 
  1955   – Anne Sofie von Otter, Swedish soprano and actress
1956 – Wendy Crewson, Canadian actress and producer
  1956   – Jana Wendt, Australian television host
1958 – Graham Smith, Canadian swimmer
1959 – Andrew Jones, New Zealand cricketer
1960 – Tony Gwynn, American baseball player and coach (d. 2014)
1961 – Sean Altman, American singer-songwriter and guitarist 
  1961   – John Corbett, American actor 
1962 – Dave Gahan, English singer-songwriter 
  1962   – Paul Heaton, English singer-songwriter 
1963 – Joe Cirella, Canadian ice hockey player and coach
1965 – Ken Nomura, Japanese race car driver and sportscaster
  1965   – Steve Yzerman, Canadian ice hockey player and manager
1966 – Mark Tinordi, Canadian ice hockey player and coach
1968 – Masahiko Harada, Japanese ski jumper
  1968   – Graham Harman, American philosopher and academic
  1968   – Ruth Kelly, British economist and politician, Secretary of State for Transport
  1968   – Marie-José Pérec, French sprinter
  1968   – Neil Ruddock, English international footballer and television personality
1970 – Doug Christie, American basketball player
  1970   – Hao Haidong, Chinese footballer
  1970   – Ghostface Killah, American rapper and actor 
1971 – Jason Lee, English footballer and manager
  1971   – Dan Chiasson, American poet and critic 
1972 – Megumi Odaka, Japanese actress and singer
1973 – Tegla Loroupe, Kenyan runner
  1973   – Leonard Myles-Mills, Ghanaian sprinter
1975 – Tamia, Canadian singer-songwriter, producer, and actress
  1975   – Brian Deegan, American motocross rider
1977 – Averno, Mexican wrestler
  1977   – Marek Jankulovski, Czech footballer 
  1977   – Svein Tuft, Canadian cyclist
1978 – Leandro Cufré, Argentinian footballer
  1978   – Santiago Dellapè, Argentinian-Italian rugby player
  1978   – Aaron Harang, American baseball player
  1978   – Marwan al-Shehhi, Emirati terrorist (d. 2001)
1979 – Pierre Bouvier, Canadian singer-songwriter and guitarist 
  1979   – Rosario Dawson, American actress
  1979   – Andrew W.K., American singer-songwriter, multi-instrumentalist, motivational speaker, and music producer
1980 – Grant Hackett, Australian swimmer
  1980   – Angela Nikodinov, American figure skater
  1980   – Tony Schmidt, German race car driver
  1980   – Jo Hyun-jae, South Korean actor
1981 – Bill Murphy, American baseball player
  1981   – Evangelos Tsiolis, Greek footballer
1983 – Giacomo Brichetto, Italian footballer
  1983   – Alan Campbell, British sculler
  1983   – Christos Marangos, Cypriot footballer
  1983   – Ryuhei Matsuda, Japanese actor
  1983   – Gilles Müller, Luxembourgian tennis player
  1983   – Tyler Lumsden, American baseball player
  1983   – Leandro Rinaudo, Italian footballer
1984 – Prince Fielder, American baseball player
  1984   – Chase Headley, American baseball player
1985 – Jake Long, American football player
  1985   – Henrique Andrade Silva, Brazilian footballer
1987 – Scott Bolton, Australian rugby league player
  1987   – Kevin Gameiro, French footballer
  1987   – Vitaliy Pushkar, Ukrainian race car driver
1988 – J. R. Fitzpatrick, Canadian race car driver
1989 – Ellen White, English footballer
1991 – Majlinda Kelmendi, Kosovar judoka
1992 – Dan Burn, English footballer
1995 – Tommy Edman, American baseball player
1996 – Saron Läänmäe, Estonian footballer
  1996   – Grace Reid, Scottish diver

Deaths

Pre-1600
 480 – Julius Nepos, Western Roman Emperor
 729 – Osric, king of Northumbria
 893 – Shi Pu, warlord of the Tang Dynasty
 909 – Adalgar, archbishop of Hamburg-Bremen
 934 – Wang Sitong, Chinese general and governor (b. 892)
1280 – Magnus VI of Norway
1315 – Hugh V, Duke of Burgundy (b. 1282)
1329 – John Drokensford, Bishop of Bath and Wells
1443 – Niccolò Albergati, Italian Cardinal and diplomat (b. 1373)
1446 – Mary of Enghien (b. 1368)
1590 – Charles de Bourbon French cardinal and pretender to the throne (b. 1523)

1601–1900
1657 – William Bradford, English-American politician, 2nd Governor of Plymouth Colony (b. 1590)
1707 – Dieterich Buxtehude, German-Danish organist and composer (b. 1637)
1736 – Diogo de Mendonça Corte-Real, Portuguese judge and politician (b. 1658)
1745 – Tomaso Antonio Vitali, Italian violinist and composer (b. 1663)
1747 – John Dalrymple, 2nd Earl of Stair, Scottish field marshal and diplomat, British Ambassador to France (b. 1673)
1760 – Nicolaus Zinzendorf, German bishop and saint (b. 1700)
1789 – Jean-Baptiste Vaquette de Gribeauval, French general and engineer (b. 1715)
1790 – William Clingan, American politician (b. 1721)
1791 – Francis Hopkinson, American judge and politician (b. 1737)
1805 – Friedrich Schiller, German poet, playwright, and historian (b. 1759)
1850 – Joseph Louis Gay-Lussac, French chemist and physicist (b. 1778)
  1850   – Garlieb Merkel, Estonian author and activist (b. 1769)
1861 – Ernst von Lasaulx, German philologist and politician (b. 1805)
1864 – John Sedgwick, American general and educator (b. 1813)
1889 – William S. Harney, American general (b. 1800)

1901–present

1906 – Oscar von Gebhardt, German theologian and academic (b. 1844)
1914 – C. W. Post, American businessman, founded Post Foods (b. 1854)
1915 – François Faber, Luxembourgian-French cyclist and soldier (b. 1887)
1915 – Anthony Wilding, New Zealand tennis player and cricketer (b. 1883)
1918 – George Coșbuc, Romanian journalist and poet (b. 1866)
1931 – Albert Abraham Michelson, German-American physicist and academic, Nobel Prize laureate (b. 1852)
1933 – John Arthur Jarvis, English swimmer (b. 1872)
1935 – Ernst Bresslau, German zoologist (b. 1877)
1938 – Thomas B. Thrige, Danish businessman (b. 1866)
1942 – Józef Cebula, Polish priest and saint (b. 1902)
1944 – Han Yong-un, Korean poet and social reformer (b. 1879)
1949 – Louis II, Prince of Monaco (b. 1870)
1950 – Esteban Terradas i Illa, Spanish mathematician and engineer (b. 1883)
1957 – Ernest de Silva, Sri Lankan banker and businessman (b. 1887)
  1957   – Ezio Pinza, Italian actor and singer (b. 1892)
1959 – Bhaurao Patil, Indian activist and educator (b. 1887)
1965 – Leopold Figl, Austrian engineer and politician, 18th Chancellor of Austria (b. 1902)
1968 – Mercedes de Acosta, American author, poet, and playwright (b. 1893)
  1968   – Harold Gray, American cartoonist, created Little Orphan Annie (b. 1894)
  1968   – Marion Lorne, American actress (b. 1883)
  1968   – Finlay Currie, British actor (b. 1878)
1970 – Walter Reuther, American union leader (b. 1907)
1976 – Jens Bjørneboe, Norwegian author, poet, and playwright (b. 1920)
  1976   – Ulrike Meinhof, German militant, co-founded the Red Army Faction (b. 1934)
1977 – James Jones, American novelist (b. 1921)
1978 – Giuseppe Impastato, Italian journalist and activist (b. 1948)
  1978   – Aldo Moro, Italian lawyer and politician, 38th Prime Minister of Italy (b. 1916)
1979 – Cyrus S. Eaton, Canadian-American banker, businessman, and philanthropist (b. 1883)
  1979   – Eddie Jefferson, American singer and lyricist (b. 1918)
1980 – Kate Molale, South African activist (b. 1928)
1981 – Nelson Algren, American novelist and short story writer (b. 1909)
1983 – Henry Bachtold, Australian soldier and railway engineer (b. 1891)
1985 – Edmond O'Brien, American actor and director (b. 1915)
1986 – Tenzing Norgay, Nepalese mountaineer (b. 1914)
1987 – Obafemi Awolowo, Nigerian lawyer and politician (b. 1909)
1993 – Penelope Gilliatt, English novelist, short story writer, and critic (b. 1932)
1994 – Elias Motsoaledi, South African activist (b. 1924)
1997 – Rawya Ateya, Egyptian captain and politician (b. 1926)
  1997   – Marco Ferreri, Italian actor, director, and screenwriter (b. 1928)
1998 – Alice Faye, American actress and singer (b. 1915)
  1998   – Talat Mahmood, Indian singer and actor (b. 1924)
2003 – Russell B. Long, American lieutenant, lawyer, and politician (b. 1918)
2004 – Akhmad Kadyrov, Chechen cleric and politician, 1st President of the Chechen Republic (b. 1951)
  2004   – Alan King, American actor, producer, and screenwriter (b. 1927)
  2004   – Brenda Fassie, South African singer (b. 1964)
2007 – Dwight Wilson, Canadian soldier (b. 1901)
2008 – Jack Gibson, Australian rugby league player, coach, and sportscaster (b. 1929)
  2008   – Baptiste Manzini, American football player (b. 1920)
  2008   – Nuala O'Faolain, Irish journalist and producer (b. 1942)
  2008   – Pascal Sevran, French singer, television host, and author (b. 1945)
2009 – Chuck Daly, American basketball player and coach (b. 1930)
2010 – Lena Horne, American singer, actress, and activist (b. 1917)
  2010   – Otakar Motejl, Czech lawyer and politician (b. 1932)
2011 – Wouter Weylandt, Belgian cyclist (b. 1984)
2012 – Bertram Cohler, American psychologist, psychoanalyst, and academic (b. 1938)
  2012   – Geoffrey Henry, Cook Islander lawyer and politician, 3rd Prime Minister of the Cook Islands (b. 1940)
  2012   – Vidal Sassoon, English-American hairdresser and businessman (b. 1928)
2013 – Ramón Blanco Rodríguez, Spanish footballer and manager (b. 1952)
  2013   – George M. Leader, American soldier and politician, 36th Governor of Pennsylvania (b. 1918)
  2013   – Humberto Lugo Gil, Mexican lawyer and politician, 23rd Governor of Hidalgo (b. 1933)
  2013   – Ottavio Missoni, Italian hurdler and fashion designer, founded Missoni (b. 1921)
2014 – Giacomo Bini, Italian priest and missionary (b. 1938)
  2014   – Harlan Mathews, American lawyer and politician (b. 1927)
  2014   – Nedurumalli Janardhana Reddy, Indian politician, 12th Chief Minister of Andhra Pradesh (b. 1935)
  2014   – Mary Stewart, British author and poet (b. 1916)
2015 – Edward W. Estlow, American football player and journalist (b. 1920)
  2015   – Kenan Evren, Turkish general and politician, 7th President of Turkey (b. 1917)
  2015   – Elizabeth Wilson, American actress (b. 1921)
2017 – Robert Miles, a Swiss-born Italian record producer, composer, musician and DJ (b. 1969)
2018 – Per Kirkeby, Danish painter, poet, film maker and sculptor (b. 1938)
2019 – Freddie Starr,  English comedian, impressionist, singer and actor (1943)  
2020 – Little Richard, American singer, songwriter, and pianist (b. 1932)
2022 – John Leo, American a writer and journalist (b. 1935)
2022 – Rieko Kodama, Japanese game developer (b. 1963)

Holidays and observances
Christian feast day:
Beatus of Lungern
Beatus of Vendome
Christopher (Eastern Orthodox Church)
George Preca
Gerontius of Cervia
Gregory of Nazianzen (The Episcopal Church (US) and traditional Roman Catholic calendar)
Nicolaus Zinzendorf (Lutheran)
Pachomius the Great
Tudy of Landevennec
May 9 (Eastern Orthodox liturgics)
Commemoration of the end of the German occupation of the Channel Islands related observances:
Liberation Day, commemorating the end of the German occupation of the Channel Islands during World War II. (Guernsey and Jersey)
National Day (Alderney)
Europe Day, commemorating the Schuman Declaration. (European Union)
Victory Day observances, celebration of the Soviet Union victory over Nazi Germany (Soviet Union, Azerbaijan, Belarus, Bosnia and Herzegovina, Georgia, Israel, Kazakhstan, Kyrgyzstan, Moldova, Russia, Serbia, Tajikistan, Turkmenistan, Ukraine, Uzbekistan)
Victory and Peace Day, marks the capture of Shusha (1992) in the First Nagorno-Karabakh War, and the end of World War II. (Armenia)
Victory Day over Nazism in World War II (Ukraine)

References

External links

 BBC: On This Day
 
 Historical Events on May 9

Days of the year
May